The Valentine Public School, at 3rd and Macomb Sts. in Valentine, Nebraska, was built in 1897. It has also been known as Centennial Hall.

It was deemed significant for listing on the National Register of Historic Places, in 1984, as being a relatively rare example of a school used for first grade through high school, originally, and for its Queen Anne style "character combined with Romanesque Revival elements".

It was listed on the National Register of Historic Places in 1984.

It is now operated as a museum, the Centennial Hall Museum.

Two other Nebraska schools that combined elementary and high schools and are listed on the National Register are the 1903-built Glenville School and the Steele City School, both in southeastern Nebraska.

References 

School buildings on the National Register of Historic Places in Nebraska
Queen Anne architecture in Nebraska
Romanesque Revival architecture in Nebraska
School buildings completed in 1897
Buildings and structures in Cherry County, Nebraska
Museums in Cherry County, Nebraska
National Register of Historic Places in Cherry County, Nebraska